Spilosoma albiventre is a moth in the family Erebidae. It was described by Sergius G. Kiriakoff in 1963. It is found in the Democratic Republic of the Congo and Tanzania.

References

Moths described in 1963
albiventre